Grace Chiumia, is a Malawian politician who has served as Minister of Civic education in the Malawian cabinet, since 24 October 2017. Before her current appointment, she was the Minister of Home Affairs and Internal Security, in the Malawian Cabinet, from 6 September 2016 until 24 October 2017.

Career
Chiuma is a medical nurse and malaria coordinator from Mzuzu. She was elected to the National Assembly to represent the Nkhata Bay West district at the May 2009 election. She was given the nickname "Obama" in 2008 by the people of her constituency as the first woman to run to represent them. She successfully ran against eight men.

In 2010, Chiumia attended Voluntary Service Overseas's MP training in Pretoria to assist parliamentarians to be more articulate on issues around HIV and AIDS policy implementation.

Chiumia was appointed Minister of Sports and Culture in August 2015, She was appointed Minister of Home Affairs and Internal Security in President Peter Mutharika's cabinet in September 2016. She is the youngest minister in the Malawian cabinet. She is also the deputy government chief whip and deputy secretary general of the ruling Democratic Progressive Party.

In November 2016, Chiumia faced demonstrations from Karonga residents over the reallocation of the Dzaleka refugee camp to Katili.

Personal life
Chiumia was widowed in 2004. After meeting Reverend Fred Garry from Watertown First Presbyterian Church in New York State, she helped start the Women of Grace Widows' Fund. She also has a daughter. She married Sam Chirwa in July 2011.

See also
 Cecilia Chazama

References

Living people
1977 births
Democratic Progressive Party (Malawi) politicians
Government ministers of Malawi
Members of the National Assembly (Malawi)
Female interior ministers
Women government ministers of Malawi
21st-century Malawian women politicians
21st-century Malawian politicians